Kyung-seok, also spelled Kyung-suk or Kyong-sok, is a Korean masculine given name. Its meaning differs based on the hanja used to write each syllable of the name. There are 54 hanja with the reading "kyung" and 20 hanja with the reading "seok" on the South Korean government's official list of hanja which may be used in given names.

People with this name include
Moon Kyoung-seok (born 1958), stage name Dragon Lee, North Korean-born South Korean martial artist
Im Gyeong-seok (born 1968), South Korean rower
Seo Gyeong-seok (born 1970), South Korean sprint canoer
Kim Kyung-seok (born 1972), South Korean field hockey player
Seo Kyung-seok (born 1972), South Korean comedian
Park Kyung-suk (handballer) (born 1981), South Korean handball player
Ri Kyong-sok (born 1981), North Korean weightlifter

Fictional characters with this name include:
Do Kyung-seok, the main character of the drama Gangnam Beauty

See also
List of Korean given names

References

Korean masculine given names